Frick Hospital is a 33-bed hospital in Mount Pleasant, Pennsylvania. Its services include general acute care, surgical services, emergency services, a sleep center, and rehabilitation services. It is owned by Excela Health. This hospital has many outpatient services.

Excela Health set in motion a five-year renovation project to modernize Frick Hospital. The first phase of the renovation was completed in 2015.

Frick Hospital rating data
The HealthGrades website contains the latest quality data for Excela Health Frick Hospital, as of 2015. For this rating section three different types of data from HealthGrades are presented: quality ratings for seventeen inpatient conditions and procedures, twelve patient safety indicators, percentage of patients giving the hospital a 9 or 10 (the two highest possible ratings).

For inpatient conditions and procedures, there are three possible ratings: worse than expected, as expected, better than expected.  For this hospital the data for this category is:
Worse than expected - 0
As expected - 15
Better than expected - 2
For patient safety indicators, there are the same three possible ratings. For this hospital safety indicators were rated as:
Worse than expected - 0
As expected - 12
Better than expected - 0

Data for patients giving this hospital a 9 or 10 are:
Patients rating this hospital as a 9 or 10 - 69%
Patients rating hospitals as a 9 or 10 nationally - 69%

References

Buildings and structures in Westmoreland County, Pennsylvania
Hospitals in Pennsylvania